The 2017–18 Gamma Ethniki was the 35th season since the official establishment of the third tier of Greek football in 1983.
It started on 1 October 2017. After the finish of the eight groups, the first team of each group will qualify for a playoff round of two groups, to determine which four teams will be promoted to Football League.

97 teams were divided into eight groups according to geographical criteria.

Panelefsiniakos, AO Chania, AEL Kalloni, Panthrakikos, Eordaikos, A.E. Istiaia, Mavroi Aetoi Eleftherochori, Amvrakia Kostakioi, APO Kanaris Nenita, Pyrsos Grevena, AO Syros, Poseidon Neoi Poroi and AO Polykratis Pythagoreio withdrew from the league before the group draw.

Group 1

Teams

Standings

Group 2

Teams

Standings

Group 3

Teams

Standings

Group 4

Teams

Standings

Group 5

Teams

Standings

Group 6

Teams

Standings

Group 7

Teams

Standings

Group 8

Teams

Standings

Promotion Playoffs

Group 1

Group 2

References

Third level Greek football league seasons
3
Greece